Lega Siaka (born 21 December 1992) is a Papua New Guinean cricketer.

International career
He made his One Day International (ODI) debut for Papua New Guinea on 8 November 2014 against Hong Kong in Australia. He made his Twenty20 International (T20I) debut for Papua New Guinea against Ireland in the 2015 ICC World Twenty20 Qualifier tournament on 15 July 2015.

He became the first player from Papua New Guinea to score a century in an ODI.

In April 2017, he scored his maiden first-class century, in round five of the 2015–17 ICC Intercontinental Cup against the United Arab Emirates.

In August 2018, he was named in Papua New Guinea's squad for Group A of the 2018–19 ICC World Twenty20 East Asia-Pacific Qualifier tournament. In March 2019, he was named in Papua New Guinea's squad for the Regional Finals of the 2018–19 ICC World Twenty20 East Asia-Pacific Qualifier tournament. He was the leading wicket-taker in the tournament, with seven dismissals in four matches. The following month, he was named in Papua New Guinea's squad for the 2019 ICC World Cricket League Division Two tournament in Namibia.

In June 2019, he was selected to represent the Papua New Guinea cricket team in the men's tournament at the 2019 Pacific Games. In September 2019, he was named in Papua New Guinea's squad for the 2019 ICC T20 World Cup Qualifier tournament in the United Arab Emirates. In August 2021, Siaka was named in Papua New Guinea's squad for the 2021 ICC Men's T20 World Cup.

References

External links
 

1992 births
Living people
Papua New Guinean cricketers
Papua New Guinea One Day International cricketers
Papua New Guinea Twenty20 International cricketers
People from the National Capital District (Papua New Guinea)